Mike Washington (January 7, 1953 – December 27, 2021) was an American former professional football player who played in 9 NFL seasons from 1976–1984 for the Tampa Bay Buccaneers.

Born in Montgomery, Alabama, Washington was an All-American at Alabama in 1974 and was selected in the 3rd round (53rd overall) of 1975 NFL Draft by the Baltimore Colts.

His career ended after a head injury in the 1984 season opener against the Chicago Bears at Soldier Field.

References 

1953 births
Living people
Players of American football from Montgomery, Alabama
American football cornerbacks
Tampa Bay Buccaneers players
Alabama Crimson Tide football players